Collège Laflèche is a private college in Trois-Rivières, Quebec. The school is named for Catholic bishop Louis-François Richer Laflèche. The school was founded in 1969 by Ursuline nuns and is governed by the Ursuline institute.

It is the only private college in the Mauricie and Centre-du-Québec region to offer both vocational and pre-university programs.

Colleges in Quebec
Education in Trois-Rivières
Buildings and structures in Trois-Rivières
Private colleges in Quebec
1969 establishments in Quebec
Educational institutions established in 1969